Soviet Empire is a political term used in history and Sovietology to describe the actions, influence and hegemony of the Soviet Union, with an emphasis on its dominant role in other countries.

In the wider sense, the term refers to the country's foreign policy during the Cold War, which has been characterized as imperialist: the nations which were part of the Soviet Empire were nominally independent countries with separate governments that set their own policies, but those policies had to stay within certain limits decided by the Soviet Union. These limits were enforced by the threat of intervention by Soviet forces, and later the Warsaw Pact. Major military interventions took place in East Germany in 1953, Hungary in 1956, Czechoslovakia in 1968, Poland in 1980-81 and Afghanistan from 1979 to 1989. Countries in the Eastern Bloc were considered satellite states.

Characteristics 

Although the Soviet Union was not ruled by an emperor, and declared itself anti-imperialist and a people's democracy, it exhibited tendencies common to historic empires. The notion of "Soviet empire" often refers to a form of "classic" or "colonial" empire with communism only replacing conventional imperial ideologies such as Christianity or monarchy, rather than creating a revolutionary state. Academically the idea is seen as emerging with Richard Pipes' 1957 book The Formation of the Soviet Union: Communism and Nationalism, 1917–1923, but it has been reinforced, along with several other views, in continuing scholarship. Several scholars hold that the Soviet Union was a hybrid entity containing elements common to both multinational empires and nation states. The Soviet Union practiced colonialism similar to conventional imperial powers.

The Soviets pursued internal colonialism in Central Asia. For example, the state's prioritized grain production over livestock in Kyrgyzstan, which favored Slavic settlers over the Kyrgyz natives, thus perpetuating the inequalities of the tsarist colonial era. Maoists argued that the Soviet Union had itself become an imperialist power while maintaining a socialist façade, or social imperialism. Another dimension of Soviet imperialism is cultural imperialism, the Sovietization of culture and education at the expense of local traditions. Leonid Brezhnev continued a policy of cultural Russification as part of Developed Socialism, which sought to assert more central control. Seweryn Bialer argued that the Soviet state had an imperial nationalism. 

A notable wave of Sovietization occurred during the Russian Civil War in the territories captured by the Red Army. Later, the territories occupied by the Russian SFSR and the USSR were Sovietized. Mongolia was conquered by the Soviet Union and Sovietized in the 1920s, and after the end of the Second World War, Sovietization took place in the countries of the Soviet Bloc (Eastern and Central Europe: Czechoslovakia, East Germany, Hungary, Poland, the Baltic states etc.). In a broad sense, it included the involuntary creation of Soviet-style authorities, imitation of elections held under the control of the Bolsheviks with the removal of opposition candidates, nationalization of land and property, repression against representatives of "class enemies" (kulaks, or osadniks, for instance). Mass executions and imprisoning in Gulag labor camps and exile settlements often accompany that process. This was usually promoted and sped up by propaganda aimed at creating a common way of life in all states within the Soviet sphere of influence. In modern history, Sovietization refers to the copying of models of Soviet life (the cult of the leader's personality, collectivist ideology, mandatory participation in propaganda activities, etc.).

From the 1930s through the 1950s, Joseph Stalin ordered population transfers in the Soviet Union, deporting people (often entire nationalities) to underpopulated remote areas, with their place being taken mostly by ethnic Russians and Ukrainians. The policy officially ended in the Khrushchev era, with some of the nationalities allowed to return in 1957. However, Nikita Khrushchev and Leonid Brezhnev refused the right of return for Crimean Tatars, Russian Germans and Meskhetian Turks. In 1991, the Supreme Soviet of Russia declared the Stalinist mass deportations to be a "policy of defamation and genocide". 

The historical relationship between Russia (the dominant republic in the Soviet Union) and these Eastern European countries helps explain their longing to eradicate the remnants of Soviet culture. Poland and the Baltic states epitomize the Soviet attempt to build uniform cultures and political systems. According to Dag Noren, Russia was seeking to constitute and reinforce a buffer zone between itself and Western Europe so as to protect itself from potential future attacks from hostile Western European countries. The Soviet Union had lost approximately 20 million people over the course of the Second World War, although Russian sources are keen on further inflating that figure. To prevent a recurrence of such costly warfare, Soviet leaders believed that they needed to establish a hierarchy of political and economic dependence between neighboring states and the USSR.

During the Brezhnev era, the policy of "Developed Socialism" declared the Soviet Union to be the most complete socialist country—other countries were "socialist", but the USSR was "developed socialist"—explaining its dominant role and hegemony over the other socialist countries. This and the interventionist Brezhnev Doctrine, permitting the invasion of other socialist countries, led to characterisation of the USSR as an empire.

Soviet influence in the "socialist-leaning countries" was mainly political and ideological rather than economically exploitative: the Soviet Union pumped enormous amounts of "international assistance" into them in order to secure influence, ultimately to the detriment of its own economy. The Soviet Union sought a group of countries which would rally to its cause in the event of an attack from Western countries, and support it in the context of the Cold War. After the dissolution of the Soviet Union, the Russian Federation was recognized as its successor state, inheriting $103 billion of Soviet foreign debt and $140 billion of Soviet assets abroad.

Economic expansion did, however, play a significant role in Soviet motivation to spread influence in its satellite territories. These new territories would ensure an increase in the global wealth which the Soviet Union would have a grasp on. 

Soviet officials from the Russian Soviet Federative Socialist Republic intertwined this economic opportunity with a potential for migration. In fact, they saw in these Eastern European countries the potential of a great workforce. They offered a welcome to them upon the only condition that they work hard and achieve social success. This ideology was shaped on the model of the meritocratic, 19th-century American foreign policy.

Formal and informal empire 
Scholars discussing Soviet empire have discussed it as a formal empire or informal empire. In a more formal interpretation of "Soviet empire", this meant absolutism, resembling Lenin's description of the tsarist empire as a "prison of the peoples" except that this "prison of the peoples" had been actualized during Stalin's regime after Lenin's death. Thomas Winderl wrote "The USSR became in a certain sense more a prison-house of nations than the old Empire had ever been."

Another view, especially of the non-Stalinist eras, sees the Soviet empire as constituting an "informal empire" over nominally sovereign states in the Warsaw Pact due to Soviet pressure and military presence. The Soviet informal empire depended on subsidies from Moscow. The informal empire in the wider Warsaw Pact also included linkages between Communist Parties. Some historians consider a more multinational-oriented Soviet Union emphasizing its socialist initiatives, such as Ian Bremmer, who describes a "matryoshka-nationalism" where a pan-Soviet nationalism included other nationalisms. Eric Hobsbawn argued that the Soviet Union had effectively designed nations by drawing borders. Dmitri Trenin wrote that by 1980, the Soviet Union had formed both a formal and informal empire.

The informal empire would have included Soviet economic investments, military occupation, and covert action in Soviet-aligned countries. The studies of informal empire have included Soviet influence on East Germany and 1930s Xinjiang. From the 1919 Karakhan Manifesto to 1927, diplomats of the Soviet Union would promise to revoke concessions in China, but the Soviets secretly kept tsarist concessions such as the Chinese Eastern Railway, as well as consulates, barracks, and churches. After the Sino-Soviet conflict (1929), the Soviet Union regained the Russian Empire's concession of the Chinese Eastern Railway and held it until its return to China in 1952.

Alexander Wendt suggested that by the time of Stalin's Socialism in one country alignment, socialist internationalism "evolved into an ideology of control rather than revolution under the rubric of socialist internationalism" internally within the Soviet Union. By the start of the Cold War it evolved into a "coded power language" that was once again international, but applied to the Soviet informal empire. At times the USSR signaled toleration of policies of satellite states indirectly, by declaring them consistent or inconsistent with socialist ideology, essentially recreating a hegemonic role. Wendt argued that a "hegemonic ideology" could continue to motivate actions after the original incentives were removed, and argued this explains the "zeal of East German Politburo members who chose not to defend themselves against trumped-up charges during the 1950s purges."

Analyzing the dissolution of the Soviet Union, Koslowski and Kratochwil argued that a postwar Soviet "formal empire" represented by the Warsaw Pact, with Soviet military role and control over of member states' foreign relations, had evolved into an informal suzerainty or "Ottomanization" from the late 1970s to 1989. With Gorbachev's relinquishing of the Brezhnev Doctrine in 1989, the informal empire reduced in pressure to a more conventional sphere of influence, resembling Finlandization but applied to the erstwhile East Bloc states, until the Soviet fall in 1991. By contrast "Austrianization" would have been a realist model of great power politics by which the Soviets would have hypothetically relied on Western guarantees to keep an artificial Soviet sphere of influence. The speed of reform in the 1989 to 1991 period made both a repeat of Finlandization and Austrianization impossible for the Soviet Union.

Allies of the Soviet Union

Warsaw Pact 
These countries were the closest allies of the Soviet Union and were also members of the Comecon, a Soviet-led economic community founded in 1949. The members of the Warsaw Pact, sometimes called the Eastern Bloc, were widely viewed as Soviet satellite states. These countries were occupied (or formerly occupied) by the Red Army, and their politics, military, foreign and domestic policies were dominated by the Soviet Union. The Warsaw Pact included the following states:
  People's Socialist Republic of Albania (1946–1968)
  People's Republic of Bulgaria (1946–1990)
  Czechoslovak Socialist Republic (1948–1990)
  German Democratic Republic (1949–1990)
  Hungarian People's Republic (1949–1989)
  Polish People's Republic (1947–1989)
  Socialist Republic of Romania (1947–1965)

In addition to having a permanent seat in the United Nations Security Council, the Soviet Union had two of its union republics in the United Nations General Assembly:

Other Marxist–Leninist states allies with the Soviet Union 
These countries were Marxist-Leninist states who were allied with the Soviet Union, but were not part of the Warsaw Pact. 
  Democratic Republic of Afghanistan (1978–1991)
  People's Republic of Angola (1975–1991)
  People's Republic of Benin (1975–1990)
  (1931–1937)
  People's Republic of China (1949–1961)
  People's Republic of the Congo (1969–1991)
  Republic of Cuba (1959–1991)
  Provisional Military Government of Socialist Ethiopia, then People's Democratic Republic of Ethiopia (1974–1991)
  People's Republic of Kampuchea (1979–1989)
  People's Revolutionary Government of Grenada (1979–1983)
  Democratic People's Republic of Korea (1948–1991, also allied with China)
  (1975–1991)
  Democratic Republic of Madagascar (1972–1991)
  Mongolian People's Republic (1924–1991)
  People's Republic of Mozambique (1975–1990)
  Somali Democratic Republic (1969–1977)
  Tuvan People's Republic (1921–1944)
  Democratic Republic of Vietnam (1954–1976), then Socialist Republic of Vietnam (1976–1991)
  Federal People's Republic of Yugoslavia (1945–1948)
  People's Democratic Republic of Yemen (South Yemen) (1967–1990)

Non-Marxist–Leninist countries allied with the Soviet Union 

Some countries in the Third World had pro-Soviet governments during the Cold War. In the political terminology of the Soviet Union, these were "countries moving along the socialist road of development" as opposed to the more advanced "countries of developed socialism" which were mostly located in Eastern Europe, but that also included Cuba and Vietnam. They received some aid, either military or economic, from the Soviet Union and were influenced by it to varying degrees. Sometimes, their support for the Soviet Union eventually stopped for various reasons and in some cases the pro-Soviet government lost power while in other cases the same government remained in power, but ultimately ended its alliance with the Soviet Union.

  (1962–1991)
  People's Republic of Bangladesh (1971–1975)
  Burkina Faso (1983–1987)
  (1962–1988)
  (1975–1990)
  (1970–1973)
  (1954–1973)
  (1964–1966)
  (1960–1978)
  Guinea Bissau (1973–1991)
  (1968–1979)
  (1971–1991)
  Indonesia (1959–1965)
  (1958–1963; 1968–1991)
  (1948–1953; 1991)
  (1972–1980)
  Libya (1969–1991)
  (1960–1991)
  (1979–1990)
  (1968–1975)
  (1976-1991)
  (1975–1991)
  Seychelles (1977–1991)
  (1968–1972)
  (1955–1991)
  (1964–1985)
  (1944–1949)
  (1969-1971)
  (1964-1991)
  (1980–1991)

Marxist–Leninist states opposed to the Soviet Union 

Some communist states were opposed to the Soviet Union and criticized many of its policies. Although they may have had many similarities to the USSR on domestic issues, they were not Soviet allies in international politics. Relations between them and the Soviet Union were often tense, sometimes even to the point of armed conflict.
  Albania (1955–1991)
  Cambodia (1975–1979)
  (1961–1989)
  Romania (1965–1989)
  Somalia (1977–1991)
  (1948–1955)

Neutral states 
The position of Finland was complex. During World War II, the Soviet Union invaded Finland in the Winter War, which ended with the 1940 Moscow Peace Treaty. Finland would re-enter the Second World War when they invaded the Soviet Union alongside Germany in late June 1941. The war ended in Soviet victory, but Finland retained most of its territory and its market economy, trading on the Western markets and ultimately joining the Western currency system.

Nevertheless, although Finland was considered neutral, the Finno-Soviet Treaty of 1948 significantly limited Finnish freedom of operation in foreign policy. It required Finland to defend the Soviet Union from attacks through its territory, which in practice prevented Finland from joining NATO, and effectively gave the Soviet Union a veto in Finnish foreign policy. Thus, the Soviet Union could exercise "imperial" hegemonic power even towards a neutral state. Under the Paasikivi–Kekkonen doctrine, Finland sought to maintain friendly relations with the Soviet Union, and extensive bilateral trade developed. In the West, this led to fears of the spread of "Finlandization", where Western allies would no longer reliably support the United States and NATO.

See also 
 American imperialism
 Anti-Russian sentiment
 Brezhnev Doctrine
 Captive Nations
 Cominform
 Communist state
 Containment
 Eastern Bloc
 Evil Empire speech
 Foreign relations of the Soviet Union
 Informal empire
 Imperialism
 Index of Soviet Union-related articles
 Military occupations by the Soviet Union
 Russian imperialism
 Russian-occupied territories
 Sino-Soviet split
 Social imperialism
 Sovietization
 Soviet Union–United States relations
 Western betrayal

Notes

References

Further reading 

 Crozier, Brian. The Rise and Fall of the Soviet Empire (1999), long detailed popular history.
 Dallin, David J. Soviet Russia and the Far East (1949) online on China and Japan.
 Friedman, Jeremy. Shadow Cold War: The Sino-Soviet Competition for the Third World (2015).
 Librach, Jan. The Rise of the Soviet Empire: A Study of Soviet Foreign Policy (Praeger, 1965), online free, a scholarly history.
 Nogee, Joseph L. and Robert Donaldson. Soviet Foreign Policy Since World War II  (4th ed. 1992).
 Service, Robert. Comrades! A history of world communism (2007).
 Ulam, Adam B. Expansion and Coexistence: Soviet Foreign Policy, 1917–1973, 2nd ed. (1974), a standard scholarly history online free.
 Zubok, Vladislav M. A Failed Empire: The Soviet Union in the Cold War from Stalin to Gorbachev (2007) excerpt and text search.

Cold War
Former empires
Soviet Union
Former empires in Europe
Imperialism
Politics of the Soviet Union
Neo-Sovietism
Nationalism in the Soviet Union
Nostalgia for the Soviet Union
Neocolonialism